Prosilio is a settlement, suburb, of the Katerini municipality. Before the 1997 local government reform it was part of the community of Svoronos. The 2011 census recorded 158 inhabitants in the settlement.

In infrastructure terms Prosilio has wooded hill and tress, the Orthodox Church of Agia Kyriaki, the Ecclesiastical Nursing Home for elderly of the Diocese of Metropolis of Kitros, Katerini and Platamonas. All the state services, such as school, medical care centre, of Svoronos service the citizens of Prosilio.

See also
 List of settlements in the Pieria regional unit

References

 
Populated places in Pieria (regional unit)
Katerini